Dromioidea is a superfamily of crabs mostly found in Madagascar.  Dromioidea belongs the group Dromiacea, taxonomically ranked as a section, which is the most basal grouping of Brachyura crabs.  Dromiacea likely diverged from the rest of Brachyura around the Late Triassic or Early Jurassic, and the earliest fossils attributable to the Dromioidea date from the Late Jurassic.

The below cladogram shows Dromioidea's placement within Dromiacea:

Recent studies have found that the Dromioidea family Dromiidae may be paraphyletic with respect to Dynomenidae.

References

Dromiacea
Extant Late Jurassic first appearances
Taxa named by Wilhem de Haan
Arthropod superfamilies